The 2015 European Short Track Speed Skating Championships took place between 23 and 25 January 2015 in Dordrecht, the Netherlands.

Medal summary

Medal table

Men's events
The results of the Championships:

Women's events

Participating nations

See also
Short track speed skating
European Short Track Speed Skating Championships

References

External links
Official website
Results book

European Short Track Speed Skating Championships
European Short Track Speed Skating Championships
European
International speed skating competitions hosted by the Netherlands
Sports competitions in Dordrecht
European Short Track Speed Skating Championships